The Filipino Journal is a newspaper published bimonthly in Winnipeg, Manitoba, Canada. It features not only Filipino news in Winnipeg and the Philippines but also topics on Filipino culture, arts, music, and literature. It was founded in 1987.

See also
List of newspapers in Canada

External links
The Filipino Journal

Multicultural and ethnic newspapers published in Canada
Newspapers published in Winnipeg
Newspapers established in 1987
1987 establishments in Manitoba
Filipino-Canadian culture in Manitoba